Jesse Rink Wallace (July 17, 1899 – January 29, 1961) was a United States Navy Captain and the governor of American Samoa. He served as governor for a period of only ten days from July 30, 1940 to August 8, 1940. Wallace was born in Beardstown, Illinois on July 17, 1899. On June 20, 1918, Wallace was appointed to the United States Naval Academy from Illinois. After his brief time as governor, Wallace became the chief of staff of the U.S. Naval Academy from 1946 to 1949. He later became chief of staff to the commandant of the Ninth Naval District. Wallace retired in 1952 and died on January 29, 1961; he was buried at the United States Naval Academy Cemetery.

References

1899 births
1961 deaths
Governors of American Samoa
United States Navy officers
United States Naval Academy alumni
Burials at the United States Naval Academy Cemetery
People from Beardstown, Illinois
Military personnel from Illinois